San Lio is a church located on the campo of the same name in the sestiere of Castello.

History 

Built in the 9th century by the patrician family of the Badoer it was first named  St Catherine of Alexandria. In 1054, it was rededicated to St Leone (san Lio in venetian dialect) in honor of pope Leo IX, who had favored the cause of Venice in a 1043 dispute between the Doge Contarini of Venice, the Patriarch of Aquileia over who had supremacy over the region of Grado.

Architecture and Interior Decoration
The presbytery was rebuilt in the 15th century, and the church underwent a major reconstruction and design in 1783. 
The latest reconstruction led to a single nave; the bell-tower was taken down. The interior retains some paintings and sculpture including: 
St James (c. 1540) by Titian 
Angels and virtues by Giandomenico Tiepolo
Dead Christ upheld by Saints and Angels (main altarpiece)  by  Jacopo Palma il Giovane .
Above the entrance to the chapel to the left is the funeral monument to Andrea Pisani, who died in 1718.

The child has an organ from the 18th century. painted with Life of David  and  Virgin with Putti .

Choir

Chapel Gusoni 
Four Evangelists, sculpture by Pietro Lombardo, and a Pietà with Saints, by his son Tullio Lombardo in the chapel of the Gussoni family.
Gussoni Red Veil Paintings Triptych (2015), by artist Sylke von Gaza commissioned by Curia Patriarcale di Venezia

Bibliography 
Le chiese di Venezia, Marcello Brusegan; Ed. Newton
Italian Wikipedia Entry

References

Lio
18th-century Roman Catholic church buildings in Italy
Baroque architecture in Venice
Roman Catholic churches completed in 1783
9th-century establishments in Italy